Stromatothecia is a genus of fungi in the family Odontotremataceae. This is a monotypic genus, containing the single species Stromatothecia nothofagi.

References

Ostropales
Ostropales genera
Taxa named by David Leslie Hawksworth